The Norwegian Parliamentary Ombud, formerly the Norwegian Parliamentary Ombudsman, is the ombudsman appointed by the Norwegian Parliament to safeguard the rights of individual citizens in their dealings with all levels of the public administration. The function was proposed by the Ministry of Justice and Police in 1961, approved by the Norwegian Parliament the same year, and the function created effective January 1, 1962. The function and scope is regulated in the Act relating to the Parliamentary Ombud for Public Administration.

List of appointed parliamentary ombudsmen 

 1962–1974: Andreas Schei
 1974–1982: Erling Sandene
 1982–1990: Audvar Os
 1990–2014: Arne Fliflet
 2014–2019: Aage Thor Falkanger
 2020–present: Hanne Harlem

References

External links 
 
 Act relating to the Parliamentary Ombudsman for Public Administration

Ombudsman posts
 Parliamentary Ombud
Parliamentary Ombud
Parliamentary Ombud
Government agencies established in 1962
Parliamentary Ombud